Iris illyrica, the Illyrian iris, is a perennial plant from the iris family (Iridaceae), native to Southeastern Europe.

Distribution
Its native range consists of much of the ancient region Illyria, for which it is named, located on the Balkan Peninsula.

It can be found growing wild in modern Slovenia, Dalmatia (Croatia), Albania, Kosovo, Bosnia and Herzegovina, Montenegro and parts of Serbia and North Macedonia.

Description
Iris illyrica grows up to 40 cm in height.

Its flowering period is May and June.

Its best planting position is in full sun. The soil requirements are dry or average moist, fertile well drained soil. It is suitable in border and rock gardens. This plant produces seeds rarely. It produces usually ten seeds that ripen out in autumn.

Taxonomy
According to the IOPI (International Organization for Plant Information) the status of this plant is still unresolved; it is often treated as a subspecies of the Dalmatian iris (Iris pallida). It has been reclassified by some as a synonym of Iris pallida subsp. illyrica.

Medicinal plant
The Illyrians (and later the Romans) considered Iris illyrica a medicinal plant with various medicinal properties.   These included the healing of boils and relief of headaches.  The plant was also believed able to induce abortion.  Parts were used in the ancient world as an anti-perspirant and for the manufacture of perfumes.

References

External links
FCD: Iris illyrica Tomm.

illyrica
Flora of Albania
Flora of Croatia
Flora of Kosovo
Flora of Bosnia and Herzegovina
Flora of Montenegro
Flora of Serbia
Flora of North Macedonia
Garden plants of Europe
Medicinal plants of Europe